Sir William Stanley Baker (28 February 192828 June 1976) was a British actor and film producer. Known for his rugged appearance and intense, grounded screen persona, he was one of the top British male film stars of the late 1950s, and later a producer.

Born into a coal mining family in Glamorgan, Baker began his acting career in the West End. Following national service in the Royal Army Service Corps after the Second World War, he befriended actor Richard Burton and began appearing in film and television roles. He played the lead role in Hell Drivers and supporting role in The Guns of Navarone.  He was producer and lead actor in the 1964 film Zulu, in which he portrayed John Chard. 

Baker's performance in the 1959 film Yesterday's Enemy was nominated for the BAFTA Award for Best British Actor, and he was nominated for a Primetime Emmy Award for his turn in the BBC serial How Green Was My Valley. He was awarded a knighthood in 1976, although he died before the investiture ceremony: a heavy smoker, he developed lung cancer and he died in 1976.

Early life
Baker was born in Ferndale, Glamorgan, Wales, the youngest of three children. His father was a coal miner who lost a leg in a pit accident but continued working as a lift operator at the mine until his death. Baker grew up a self-proclaimed "wild kid" interested in only "football and boxing". He thought he would most likely be a miner or maybe a boxer.

His artistic ability was spotted at an early age by a local teacher, Glynne Morse, who encouraged Baker to act. When he was 14 he was performing in a school play when seen by a casting director from Ealing Studios, who recommended him for a role in Undercover (1943), a war film about the Yugoslav guerrillas in Serbia. He was paid £20 a week, caught the acting bug, and pursued a professional acting career. Six months later Baker appeared with Emlyn Williams in a play in the West End called The Druid's Rest, appearing alongside Richard Burton.

Baker worked for a time as an apprentice electrician, then through Morse's influence, he managed to secure a position with the Birmingham Repertory Theatre in 1944. He was there for three years when he had to do his national service. He served in the Royal Army Service Corps from 1946 until 1948, attaining the rank of sergeant. Following his demobilisation Baker returned to London determined to resume his acting career. He was recommended by Richard Burton for casting in a small role in Terence Rattigan's West End play, Adventure Story (1949).

Early career
He began appearing in films and on television, as well as performing on stage for the Middlesex Repertory Company.  He had small roles in All Over the Town (1949), Obsession (1949), Your Witness (1950), Lilli Marlene (1950), Something in the City (1950), The Rossiter Case (1951), Cloudburst (1951),  Home to Danger (1951) and Whispering Smith Hits London (1952).

His TV roles included The Tragedy of Pompey the Great (1950) and Rush Job (1951).
H
Baker attracted attention when cast as the bosun's mate in the Hollywood-financed Captain Horatio Hornblower (1951). It was the ninth most popular film at the British box office that year.

In 1951 he toured England in a play by Christopher Fry, A Sleep of Prisoners which was part of the Festival of Britain. It was about four POWs spending a night in a bombed out church and was staged in actual churches; the rest of the cast includes Denholm Elliott, Hugh Pryse and Leonard White. The project was transferred in its entirety to New York for a limited run, and also toured throughout the US.

While in New York, Baker read the novel The Cruel Sea by Nicholas Monsarrat. Although the role of the cowardly officer Bennett was an Australian in the book, the Englishman Donald Sinden was originally screen-tested for the part and the Welsh Baker was screen-tested for the part of Lockhart. Subsequently, at Jack Hawkins' suggestion and after further screen-tests, the roles were swapped. The Cruel Sea (1953 film) was the most successful film at the British box office in 1953 and Baker was now established in films.

On television was in "A Cradle in Willow" and played Petruchio in a version of Taming of the Shrew (1952). He had a small role in a British-US co-production for Warwick Films, The Red Beret (1953), with Alan Ladd, another big hit in Britain. Warwick liked his work so much they promptly reteamed him with Ladd in Hell Below Zero (1954), with Baker billed fourth as the main villain.

Baker got another break when George Sanders fell ill and was unable to play Sir Mordred in the expensive epic Knights of the Round Table (1953), made by MGM in Britain. Baker stepped in and got excellent reviews; the movie was very popular.

He had his biggest role in a purely British film with The Good Die Young (1954), directed by Lewis Gilbert, playing a boxer who commits a robbery. Baker was cast in Twist of Fate (1954) opposite Ginger Rogers, replacing Walter Rilla, who quit the production ten days into filming.
Hollywood came calling again and offered him the choice support role of Achilles in Helen of Troy (1955), shot in Italy for Robert Wise.

Most of Baker's film roles until this stage had been playing villains. His career received another boost when Laurence Olivier selected him to play Henry Tudor in Richard III (1955).

On TV he was in The Creature (1955) by Nigel Kneale, later filmed (without Baker) as The Abominable Snowman (1957). He was in another epic, playing Attalus in Alexander the Great (1956), which starred Burton in the title role and was shot in Spain for Robert Rossen. He also portrayed Rochester in a British TV adaptation of Jane Eyre (1956).

Baker's first leading role in a feature film came with Child in the House (1956), written and directed by Cy Endfield. He had a support role as a psychotic corporal in A Hill in Korea (1956), a Korean War film that also featured early performances from Michael Caine, Stephen Boyd and Robert Shaw. He was the villain in a racing car drama, Checkpoint (1956), opposite Anthony Steel. It was made by the team of Betty E. Box and Ralph Thomas for the Rank Organisation.

Lead actor
Baker finally broke away from supporting parts when cast as the lead in Hell Drivers (1957), a truck driving drama directed by Endfield. Before it was released he played another villain role for Box and Thomas, Campbell's Kingdom (1957), opposite Dirk Bogarde, shot in Italy (substituting for Canada). Following this he was meant to make Tread Softly Stranger with Diana Dors but George Baker was cast instead. Hell Drivers was a minor hit, and at the end of the year exhibitors voted Baker the seventh most popular British star at the British box office for 1957 (after Bogarde, Kenneth More, Peter Finch, John Gregson, Norman Wisdom and John Mills, and before Ian Carmichael, Jack Hawkins and Belinda Lee). The success of Hell Drivers saw Baker play a series of tough anti-heroes. In the words of David Thomson:
Until the early 1960s, Baker was the only male lead in the British cinema who managed to suggest contempt, aggression and the working class. He is the first hint of proletarian male vigor against the grain of Leslie Howard, James Mason, Stewart Granger, John Mills, Dirk Bogarde and the theatrical knights. Which is not to disparage these players, but to say that Baker was a welcome novelty, that he is one of Britain's most important screen actors, and that he has not yet been equalled – not even by Michael Caine.
Baker was a detective in Violent Playground (1958), a drama about juvenile delinquency from the director-producer team Basil Dearden and Michael Relph. He was reunited with Endfield for Sea Fury (1958), an action drama, playing a tugboat captain. He was voted the tenth biggest British star in Britain at the end of the year.

He made the Hollywood-financed The Angry Hills (1959) in Greece with Robert Aldrich opposite Robert Mitchum. Baker said Aldrich offered to engage him in a 28-part series about an Englishman in New York, but he had turned it down to stay in Britain.

Baker had the lead in Yesterday's Enemy (1959), a World War II drama set in Burma for Hammer Films, directed by Val Guest.
He was a detective in Blind Date (1959) for director Joseph Losey, one of Baker's favourite roles. He made a fourth film with Endfield, Jet Storm (1959) playing an airline captain. None of these films were particularly huge at the box office but at the end of the year Baker was voted the fourth most popular British star. Hell Is a City (1960) had him as another hardbitten detective, a second collaboration with Val Guest. He was reunited with Losey for The Criminal (1960), playing an ex-con, and Baker's favourite role.

He played the relatively small role of "Butcher Brown", a war-weary commando, in the Hollywood blockbuster war epic The Guns of Navarone (1961) shot in Greece. It was a massive hit at the box office.

A third collaboration with Losey was Eva (1962), a French-Italian film where Baker acted opposite Jeanne Moreau. Aldrich asked him to play another villain role, in the Biblical epic Sodom and Gomorrah (1962). There was some talk he would play Rufio in Cleopatra (1963) but it did not eventuate. He was a tough army officer committing a robbery in A Prize of Arms (1962) but the film failed at the box office and it seemed the market for the tough action films in which Baker had specialised might be drying up. He appeared opposite Jean Seberg in In the French Style (1962), a French-American romance produced by Irwin Shaw.  He was in The Man Who Finally Died (1963) for British TV.

Baker's widow later claimed that he was originally offered the role of James Bond, but turned it down not wanting to commit to a long-term contract. She also says he was going to star in This Sporting Life but had to drop out when Guns of Navarone went over schedule. She says Baker never regretted losing the part of Bond to Sean Connery but regretted not making This Sporting Life.

Production

Baker formed his own company, 'Diamond Films' with Cy Endfield. They developed a script about the Battle of Rorke's Drift written by Endfield and John Prebble. While making Sodom and Gomorrah Baker struck up a relationship with that film's producer, Joseph E. Levine which enabled him to raise the $3 million budget for Zulu (1964), directed by Endfield, shot partly on location in South Africa. Zulu was a big hit at the box office and made a star of Michael Caine. Baker played the lead part of Lieutenant John Chard VC in what remains his best-remembered role. He later owned Chard's Victoria Cross and Zulu War Medal from 1972 until his death in 1976. (Chard died at age 49 in 1897, only a year older than Baker at his death; both died of cancer).

Baker made two more films in South Africa: Dingaka (1965), on which he worked as an actor only but which was distributed by Levine, and Sands of the Kalahari (1965), which he starred in and produced, directed by Endfield and financed by Levine. Both were box-office failures commercially and Baker made no further films with Endfield. Baker had plans to film Wilbur Smith's debut novel When the Lion Feeds and The Coral Strand by John Masters. but neither project was realised.

He made a TV movie for the United Nations entitled Who Has Seen the Wind? (1965), and appeared in two episodes of Bob Hope Presents the Chrysler Theatre: After the Lion, Jackals (1966) and Code Name: Heraclitus (1967). In 1966 he made a deal with Universal to produce and star in a film. He made a final film with Losey, Accident (1967), cast against type as an academic.

Baker formed the production company Oakhurst Productions with Michael Deeley. Its first cinema film was Robbery (1967), a heist film with Baker in the lead role. It was a solid success in Britain and launched the Hollywood career of director Peter Yates. Baker announced he would make another film for Levine, A Nice Girl Like Me acting opposite Hayley Mills who would play a girl who constantly gets pregnant. The film would be made by Levine, but not with Baker or Mills. He was also going to film the John Roeburt novel The Climate of Hell with James Goldstone. and the Norman Lewis novel Everyman's Brother. He appeared in The Girl with the Pistol (1968), an Italian comedy, then worked as a producer only on two films for Oakhurst: The Other People (1968), which was never released, and The Italian Job (1969) a heist comedy with Michael Caine, a big hit. He was also part of the consortium which set up Harlech Television. At the end of 1968 exhibitors voted him the ninth biggest star in Britain, after John Wayne, Julie Christie, Steve McQueen, Tommy Steele, Paul Newman, Sean Connery, Clint Eastwood and Julie Andrews.

Baker produced and starred in Where's Jack? (1969) for Oakhurst opposite Tommy Steele for director James Clavell. It was a box office failure.
As an actor only, he appeared in The Games (1970) for 20th Century Fox. He appeared in two films for producer Dimitri de Grunwald: The Last Grenade (1970), playing a mercenary, and Perfect Friday (1970), a heist movie directed by Peter Hall which Baker helped produce.

Later career
In the 1970s, Baker announced a number of projects as producer: an adaptation of George MacDonald Fraser's novel Flashman, to be directed by Richard Lester; Summer Fires with Peter Hall."I don't make films to see myself perform, I do it to act", said Baker. "I've enjoyed everything I've worked on, including the bad pictures... I enjoy being a working actor. I've been accused by journalists of lack of discretion, lack of taste. Well I'd rather have that lack than the lack of having made them... Producing is total involvement and compatible with acting, while I don't think directing is. Producing gives you a continuity of effort that helps with acting."

He also expanded his business interests. He was one of the founder members of Harlech Television, and was a director of it until his death.

With Michael Deeley and Barry Spikings, he formed 'Great Western Enterprises', which was involved in a number of projects in the entertainment field, notably music concerts, and in the late 1960s it bought Alembic House (now called Peninsula Heights) on the Albert Embankment, where Baker occupied the penthouse apartment for a number of years. Baker, Deeley, and Spikings were also part of a consortium that bought British Lion Films and Shepperton Studios, selling Alembic House to finance it. Baker said in 1972 that:
I love business for the activity it creates, the total commitment. The acting bit is great for the ego, (but) all the real excitement is in business... I'm still surprised how good I am at business.

However, Baker was the victim of bad timing. The British film industry went into serious decline at the end of the 1960s, and a number of Oakhurst films were unsuccessful at the box office. Plans to make a costume drama called Sunblack, directed by Gordon Flemyng, did not come to fruition. His commercial foray into pop music festivals was financially disastrous, with the Great Western Bardney Pop Festival in Lincoln ending up losing £200,000. The British stock market crashed at the end of 1973, throwing the over-leveraged British Lion into turmoil.

Baker was forced to keep acting to pay the bills, often accepting roles in poor films which adversely affected his status as a star. His son Glyn later said that:"My dad had to accept any and everything to keep the companies afloat. Doing staggeringly-bad stuff like Popsy Pop, which was an Italian–Venezuelan co-production and A Lizard in a Woman's Skin [both 1971] – a movie which makes absolutely no sense whatsoever. At the slowest period, Stanley still had a payroll of at least 100 in his employ. So it was, 'Here we go – take the money, make this trash, hopefully, no one will ever see it.' Famous last words."'
According to Michael Deeley, the financiers of British Lion Films were reluctant for Baker to be involved in the management of the company because they felt his focus was more on his acting career.

The Butterfly Affair (1970) was with Claudia Cardinale; A Lizard in a Woman's Skin (1971) was an Italian giallo movie; Innocent Bystanders (1972) was directed by Peter Collinson who had done The Italian Job.

Towards the end of his life Baker pulled back on his business activities and worked mostly as an actor, taking roles in television including two of the BBC's  Play of the Month series: The Changeling and Robinson Crusoe (both 1974), plus Who Killed Lamb? (1974) and Graceless Go I (1974).

He made a series of films in Spain: Zorro (1975), starring Alain Delon, where Baker played the main villain; Bride to Be (1975), with Sarah Miles.

Baker's final British performance was in a BBC Wales adaptation of How Green Was My Valley (1975), broadcast shortly before he was diagnosed with cancer. Shortly before his death he was planning on producing a prequel to Zulu, Zulu Dawn. His last role was in an Italian TV miniseries,  (1976), based on the novel Orzowei.

Death
Baker was a heavy cigarette and cigar smoker, and was diagnosed with lung cancer on 13 February 1976. He underwent surgery later that month. However, the cancer had spread to his bones and he died from pneumonia on 28 June 1976, in Málaga, Spain, aged 48.

His body was cremated at Putney Vale Crematorium; his ashes being scattered on a hillside overlooking his childhood home. He told his wife shortly before he died:
I have no regrets. I've had a fantastic life; no one has had a more fantastic life than I have. From the beginning I have been surrounded by love. I'm the son of a Welsh miner and I was born into love, married into love and spent my life in love.

Personal life
In 1950 Baker married the actress Ellen Martin, who had been introduced to him by Burton. Their marriage lasted until his death and they had four children, Martin and Sally (twins), Glyn and Adam. Glyn appeared in The Wild Geese (1978), opposite Richard Burton, and in Return of the Jedi (1983), as Lieutenant Endicott, the imperial officer who said, "Inform the commander that Lord Vader's shuttle has arrived."

He was a friend and drinking companion of Richard Burton. 

Baker was politically a socialist, and an acquaintance of Prime Minister Harold Wilson. He was an opponent of Welsh nationalism and recorded television broadcasts in support of the Welsh Labour Party. In a 1969 interview he said, "I'm a Welshman and proud of it, but I'm no nationalist. I think the Welsh Nationalists are foolish and misguided people." Baker was heavily criticised for earning vast sums of money despite propounding left-wing politics, sending all his children to English public schools, and owning a large holiday home in Spain.

He considered becoming a tax exile in the 1960s but ultimately decided he would miss Britain too much. Many of his friends believed Baker had damaged his acting career through his attempts to transform himself into a businessman.

In an interview shortly before his death he admitted to being a compulsive gambler all his life, although he claimed he always had enough money to look after his family.

On 27 May 1976, it was announced that he had been awarded a knighthood in the 1976 Prime Minister's Resignation Honours, although he did not live to be invested in person at Buckingham Palace.

Legacy
Ferndale RFC, a rugby club in the Rhondda Valleys, South Wales, established a tribute to Baker in the form of their "Sir Stanley Baker Lounge". Officially opened by his widow, Ellen Lady Baker, on Friday 24 November 2006, the day's events featured a presentation to Sir Stanley's sons and family members, and a fitting and moving tribute to the man himself via speeches and tales from celebrities and various local people who knew him best. The afternoon also featured a BBC Radio Wales tribute to Sir Stanley, hosted by Owen Money and recorded live in Ferndale RFC itself. The Sir Stanley Baker Lounge features many pictures and memorabilia from his successful career, including a wall plaque commemorating the official opening in both English and Welsh.

Filmography

TV series, miniseries and films

Box office rankings
Baker featured several times in the annual poll of British exhibitors for Motion Picture Annual listing the most popular stars at the local box office:
1957 – 7th most popular British star
1958 – 10th most popular British star
1959 – 4th most popular British star
1960 – 8th most popular star in Britain regardless of nationality
1968 – 9th most popular star in Britain regardless of nationality

Select theatre credits
The Druid's Rest by Emlyn Williams (1943) – with Richard Burton
1944–46 – various with Birmingham Repertory Theatre
Adventure Story by Terence Rattigan (1949) – with Paul Scofield
Treasure Island (1949) – with Middlesex Repertory Company
Wuthering Heights (1949) – with Middlesex Repertory Company

Awards
1959 BAFTA – Nomination for Best British Actor for Yesterday's Enemy

References

Bibliography

External links
 
 Stanley Baker biography and credits, Screenonline.org. Retrieved 8 April 2014. 
 The Sir Stanley Baker Tribute Site, freewebs.com. Retrieved 8 April 2014.
 Ferndale RFC official website, "Sir Stanley Baker Lounge". Retrieved 8 April 2014.

1928 births
1976 deaths
20th-century British Army personnel
20th-century Welsh businesspeople
20th-century Welsh male actors
Actors awarded knighthoods
Burials at Putney Vale Cemetery
Deaths from lung cancer in Spain
Deaths from pneumonia in Spain
Knights Bachelor
Labour Party (UK) people
People from Ferndale, Rhondda Cynon Taf
Royal Army Service Corps soldiers
Welsh expatriates in Spain
Welsh film producers
Welsh male film actors
Welsh male stage actors
Welsh male television actors
Welsh socialists